Juan Martín del Potro was the defending champion, and won for the second straight year in the final 3–6, 7–5, 7–6(8–6), over Andy Roddick.

Seeds
All seeds receive a bye into the second round.

Draw

Finals

Top half

Section 1

Section 2

Bottom half

Section 3

Section 4

Qualifying

Seeds

Qualifiers

Lucky loser

Draw

First qualifier

Second qualifier

Third qualifier

Fourth qualifier

Fifth qualifier

Sixth qualifier

External links
Main draw
Qualifying draw

Singles